Eduardo Magalhaes Machado, commonly known as Duda Machado (born 10 September 1982 in Rio de Janeiro) is a Brazilian professional basketball player. At a height of 1.96 m (6'5") tall, he plays at the shooting guard and small forward positions.

Professional career
After playing with the youth teams of Fluminense, in his pro club career, Machado has played in both the South American 2nd-tier level FIBA South American League, and the South American top-tier level FIBA Americas League.

National team career
Machado was a member of the senior Brazilian national basketball team. With Brazil, he played at the 2008 FIBA World Olympic Qualifying Tournament. He also won a gold medal at the 2009 FIBA AmeriCup.

Personal
Duda's father, Renê Machado, was a Brazilian club basketball player in the 1960s and 1970s. His uncle, Sérgio "Macarrão" Toledo Machado, was also a successful basketball player with the senior men's Brazilian national basketball team, in the 1960s and 1970s. Duda's older brother, Marcelinho Machado, was also a long-time professional basketball player, and he is one of the most well-known players Brazil ever produced.

References

External links
FIBA Profile
Latinbasket.com Profile
NBB Profile 

1982 births
Living people
Associação Atlética Mackenzie College basketball players
Associação Bauru Basketball players
Associação de Basquete Cearense players
Associação Limeirense de Basquete players
Associação Macaé de Basquete players
Brazilian men's basketball players
CR Vasco da Gama basketball players
Flamengo basketball players
Novo Basquete Brasil players
Shooting guards
Small forwards
Basketball players from Rio de Janeiro (city)
UniCEUB/BRB players